Castelverde, also named Gasr Garabulli, is a town in the Tripoli District (Tarabulus), of the Tripolitania region in northwestern Libya.

From 2001 to 2007 it was part of the Tajura wa Al Nawahi AlArba‘ District, which then was merged into Tripoli District.

History
Castelverde was founded as a colonial settlement in Italian Libya, and is a namesake of the town Castelverde in Lombardy, Italy.

In June 2016, citizens took up arms to defend against a militia from the nearby city of Misrata after a dispute developed between them. During the conflict, a large blast killed 25 people.

It's very popular for its sandy peaches and considered the best rated beach in the country.

Geography
The town is situated on the main road between Tripoli and Khoms, Libya, near the Mediterranean Sea coast. The new Libyan railway line passes through Castelverde.

See also
 Railway stations in Libya

References

Populated places in Tripoli District, Libya
Baladiyat of Libya